James Henry Vaughan (May 9, 1934 – June 8, 1996) was a Canadian politician. He represented the electoral districts of Halifax North and Halifax Chebucto in the Nova Scotia House of Assembly from 1963 to 1970. He was a member of the Progressive Conservative Party of Nova Scotia.

Vaughan was born in 1934 at Dartmouth, Nova Scotia. He was educated at Saint Mary's University, and was a surveyor by career. He married Shirley Juanita Fox in 1954. Vaughan died of cancer on June 8, 1996 in Halifax.

References

1934 births
1996 deaths
Progressive Conservative Association of Nova Scotia MLAs
People from Dartmouth, Nova Scotia
Saint Mary's University (Halifax) alumni